Francesco Vassallo a.k.a. don Ciccolo, don Frankie or King Concrete (born c. 1910)  was an Italian entrepreneur that associated with Mafia in the 1950s. His son Giuseppe "Pino" Vassallo was kidnapped in 1971.

References

Further reading
 

Italian businesspeople
1910s births
Year of death missing